The FIS Alpine World Ski Championships 1982 were held in Schladming, Austria, between 28 January and 7 February 1982. These were the 27th World Championships; the men's races were held at Planai and the women's at Haus im Ennstal.

The combined event returned as a separate event, with its own downhill and two slalom runs. From 1954 through 1980, it was a "paper race" which used the results from the three races (downhill, giant slalom, and slalom). The combined was last run at the world championships in 1948, the last without the giant slalom event. The combined was absent from the program in 1950 and 1952.

Ingemar Stenmark of Sweden won gold in the slalom and silver in the giant slalom, upset by Steve Mahre of the United States. Two women were triple medalists: Erika Hess of Switzerland won three golds, with titles in the slalom, giant slalom, and combined, and Christin Cooper of the U.S. won two silvers and a bronze.  Switzerland and the U.S. led in total medals with five each; Switzerland had three golds (Hess') and five other nations each had a single gold medal.

These were the last World Championships scheduled for an even-numbered year (1996 was a postponement of 1995, due to lack of snow). The world championships returned to Schladming in 2013, with all 11 events held at Planai.

Men's competitions
Races were held at Planai.

Downhill
Saturday, 6 February
Source:

Giant Slalom
Wednesday, 3 February
Source:

Slalom
Sunday, 7 February
Source:

Combined
Monday, 1 February (slalom: 2 runs)
Friday, 5 February (downhill)

Source:

Women's competitions
Races were held at Haus im Ennstal.

Downhill
Thursday, 4 February
Source:

Giant Slalom
Tuesday, 2 February
Source:

Slalom
Friday, 5 February
Source:

Combined
Thursday, 28 January (downhill)
Sunday, 31 January (slalom: 2 runs)
Source:

Medals table
References

External links
FIS-Ski.com – results – 1982 World Championships – Schladming, Austria
FIS-ski.com – results – World Championships 

FIS Alpine World Ski Championships
1982 in Austrian sport
1982
A
Alpine skiing competitions in Austria
January 1982 sports events in Europe
February 1982 sports events in Europe